Commandant Charcot Glacier is a prominent glacier about  wide and  long, flowing north-northwest from the continental ice to its terminus at the head of Victor Bay. It was delineated from aerial photographs taken by U.S. Navy Operation Highjump, 1946–47. The French Antarctic Expedition, 1950–1952, under Mario Marret sledged west along the coast to Victor Bay, close east of this glacier, in December 1952, and it was named by them for the polar ship Commandant Charcot which transported French expeditions to this area, 1948–1952.

See also
 Commandant Charcot Glacier Tongue
 List of glaciers in the Antarctic
 Glaciology

References 

Glaciers of Adélie Land